This is the structure of the Royal Canadian Air Force, as of November 2020.

Headquarters, Royal Canadian Air Force
Headquarters, Royal Canadian Air Force, at Major-General George R Pearkes Building, Ottawa
Commander of the Royal Canadian Air Force, Lieutenant-General Alexander Meinzinger
Chief Warrant Officer of the Air Force, Denis Gaudreault

Royal Canadian Air Force Aerospace Warfare Centre (RAWC)
Headquarters, Royal Canadian Air Force Aerospace Warfare Centre, at CFB Trenton
434 Operational Test and Evaluation Squadron, at CFB Trenton 
414 EWS (Electronic Warfare Support) Squadron, On 7 December 2007 approval was received for the squadron to stand up once more, this time as 414 EWS (Electronic Warfare Support) Squadron. Belonging to the RCAF Aerospace Warfare Centre, the squadron is based in Ottawa and is composed of military Electronic Warfare Officers who fulfil the combat support role, flying on civilian contracted aircraft.  The squadron was re-formed at Gatineau Airport, Quebec, on 20 January 2009 to operate the Dassault/Dornier Alpha Jet provided by Top Aces Canada.

1 Canadian Air Division
Headquarters, 1 Canadian Air Division, at CFB Winnipeg
1 Wing Kingston, at CFB Kingston
400 Tactical Helicopter Squadron, at CFB Borden, (CH-146 Griffon)
403 Helicopter Operational Training Squadron, at CFB Gagetown, (CH-146 Griffon)
408 Tactical Helicopter Squadron, at CFB Edmonton, (CH-146 Griffon)
430 Tactical Helicopter Squadron, at CFB Valcartier, (CH-146 Griffon)
438 Tactical Helicopter Squadron, at CFB St. Hubert, (CH-146 Griffon)
450 Tactical Helicopter Squadron, at CFB Petawawa, (CH-147F Chinook)
3 Wing Bagotville, at CFB Bagotville
3 Air Maintenance Squadron, at CFB Bagotville
12 Radar Squadron, at CFB Bagotville
425 Tactical Fighter Squadron, at CFB Bagotville, (CF-18 Hornet)
433 Tactical Fighter Squadron, at CFB Bagotville, (CF-18 Hornet)
439 Combat Support Squadron, at CFB Bagotville, (CH-146 Griffon)
3 Wing Air Reserve Flight, at CFB Bagotville
Canadian NORAD Region Forward Operating Location Iqaluit
4 Wing Cold Lake, at CFB Cold Lake
1 Air Maintenance Squadron, at CFB Cold Lake
10 Field Technical Training Squadron, at CFB Cold Lake
42 Radar Squadron, at CFB Cold Lake, (AN/TPS-70)
401 Tactical Fighter Squadron, at CFB Cold Lake, (CF-18 Hornet)
409 Tactical Fighter Squadron, at CFB Cold Lake, (CF-18 Hornet)
410 Tactical Fighter Operational Training Squadron, at CFB Cold Lake, (CF-18 Hornet)
417 Combat Support Squadron, at CFB Cold Lake, (CH-146 Griffon)
419 Tactical Fighter Training Squadron, at CFB Cold Lake, (CT-155 Hawk)
4 Wing Air Reserve Flight, at CFB Cold Lake
Canadian NORAD Region Forward Operating Location Inuvik, at Inuvik (Mike Zubko) Airport
Canadian NORAD Region Forward Operating Location Yellowknife, at Yellowknife Airport
5 Wing Goose Bay, at CFB Goose Bay
444 Combat Support Squadron, at CFB Goose Bay, (CH-146 Griffons)
5 Wing Air Reserve Flight, at CFB Goose Bay
Canadian NORAD Region Forward Operating Location Goose Bay
8 Wing Trenton, at CFB Trenton
2 Air Movements Squadron, at CFB Trenton
8 Air Maintenance Squadron, at CFB Trenton
412 Transport Squadron, at Ottawa International Airport, (CC-144 Challenger)
424 Transport and Rescue Squadron, at CFB Trenton, (C-130H Hercules, CH-146 Griffon)
426 Transport Training Squadron, at CFB Trenton
429 Transport Squadron, at CFB Trenton, (CC-177 Globemaster III)
436 Transport Squadron, at CFB Trenton, (CC-130J Super Hercules)
437 Transport Squadron, at CFB Trenton, (CC-150 Polaris)
440 Transport Squadron, at Yellowknife Airport, (CC-138 DHC-6 Twin Otter)
8 Air Wing Reserve Flight, at CFB Trenton
Multi-Engine Utility Flight, at CFB Trenton, (King Air BE350)
Canadian Forces Station Alert, at Ellesmere Island
Canadian Army Advanced Warfare Centre, at CFB Trenton
Joint Rescue Coordination Centre Trenton, at CFB Trenton
Search and Rescue Network Operations Communications Centre, at CFB Trenton
9 Wing Gander, at CFB Gander
103 Search and Rescue Squadron, at CFB Gander, (CH-149 Cormorant)
9 Wing Reserve Flight, at CFB Gander
Air Reserve Flight Detachment Torbay, at CFS St. John's
12 Wing Shearwater, at Shearwater Heliport
12 Air Maintenance Squadron, at Shearwater Heliport
406 Maritime Operational Training Squadron, at Shearwater Heliport, (CH-148 Cyclone)
423 Maritime Helicopter Squadron, at Shearwater Heliport, (CH-148 Cyclone)
443 Maritime Helicopter Squadron, at Patricia Bay, (CH-148 Cyclone)
12 Wing Air Reserve Flight, at Shearwater Heliport
14 Wing Greenwood, at CFB Greenwood
14 Air Maintenance Squadron, at CFB Greenwood
14 Construction Engineering Squadron, at Bridgewater<ref="reserve"></ref>
404 Long Range Patrol and Training Squadron, at CFB Greenwood
405 Long Range Patrol Squadron, at CFB Greenwood, (CP-140 Aurora)
413 Transport and Rescue Squadron, at CFB Greenwood, (C-130 Hercules, CH-149 Cormorant)
415 Long Range Patrol Force Development Squadron, at CFB Greenwood
14 Wing Air Reserve Flight, at CFB Greenwood
91 Construction Engineering Flight, at CFB Gander
143 Construction Engineering Flight, at Lunenburg
144 Construction Engineering Flight, at Pictou
17 Wing Winnipeg, at CFB Winnipeg
402 "City of Winnipeg" Squadron, at CFB Winnipeg
17 Wing Air Reserve Flight, at CFB Winnipeg
Royal Canadian Air Force Band, at CFB Winnipeg
19 Wing Comox, at CFB Comox
19 Air Maintenance Squadron, at CFB Comox
407 Long Range Patrol Squadron, at CFB Comox, (CP-140 Aurora)
418 Search and Rescue Operational Training Squadron, at CFB Comox
435 "Chinthe" Transport and Rescue Squadron, at CFB Winnipeg, (C-130H Hercules)
442 Transport and Rescue Squadron, at CFB Comox, (DHC-5 Buffalo, CH-149 Cormorant)
19 Wing Air Reserve Flight, at CFB Comox
192 Construction Engineering Flight, at Abbotsford
Canadian Forces School of Search and Rescue, at CFB Comox
22 Wing North Bay, at CFB North Bay
21 Aerospace Control and Warning Squadron, at CFB North Bay
51 Aerospace Control and Warning Operational Training Squadron, at CFB North Bay
22 Wing Air Reserve Flight, at CFB North Bay
Detachment 2, First Air Force (USAF), at CFB North Bay

2 Canadian Air Division
Headquarters, 2 Canadian Air Division, at CFB Winnipeg
Canadian Forces Aircrew Selection Centre, at CFB Trenton
15 Wing Moose Jaw, at CFB Moose Jaw
2 Canadian Forces Flying Training School, at CFB Moose Jaw, (CT-155 Hawk, CT-156 Harvard II)
3 Canadian Forces Flying Training School, at Southport Aerospace Centre, (Grob G 120A, Bell CH-139, CH-146 Griffon)
15 Air Traffic Control Squadron, at CFB Moose Jaw
431 Air Demonstration Squadron (Snowbirds), at CFB Moose Jaw, (CT-114 Tutor)
16 Wing Borden, at CFB Borden
16 Wing Air Reserve Flight, at CFB Borden
Royal Canadian Air Force Academy, at CFB Borden
Canadian Forces School of Aerospace Technology and Engineering, at CFB Borden
Canadian Forces School of Aerospace Control Operations, at Cornwall

3 Canadian Space Division
Officially stood up on 22 July 2022, 3 Canadian Space Division (3 CSD) ( or ) is the Air Force's main agency responsible for delivering space power effects in support of Canadian Armed Forces operations.

The division's primary operational formation is 7 Wing, which was originally meant to be the operational base formation at Canadian Forces Base Ottawa before cutbacks in the 1990s saw the base effectively closed.  7 Wing is composed of two operational units:
7 Space Operations Squadron
7 Operations Support Squadron

Air Force Expeditionary Capability
2 Wing Bagotville, at CFB Bagotville
2 Mission Support Squadron, at CFB Bagotville
2 Air Expeditionary Training Squadron, at CFB Bagotville
2 Operational Support Squadron, at CFB Bagotville
4 Construction Engineering Squadron, at CFB Cold Lake
8 Air Communication and Control Squadron, at CFB Trenton

References

Structure of contemporary air forces
Units and formations of the Royal Canadian Air Force
Royal Canadian Air Force
Canadian Armed Forces